This is a list of European languages by the number of native speakers in Europe only.

List

Notes

References 

Languages of Europe